Astartea montana, commonly known as Stirling Range astartea, is a shrub endemic to Western Australia.

The shrub is found along the south coast in the Great Southern region of Western Australia.

References

Eudicots of Western Australia
montana
Endemic flora of Western Australia
Plants described in 2013
Taxa named by Barbara Lynette Rye